Nematobrachion is a genus of krill, containing the following three species:
Nematobrachion boopis (Calman, 1896)
Nematobrachion flexipes (Ortmann, 1893)
Nematobrachion sexspinosus Hansen, 1911

References

Krill
Crustacean genera
Taxa named by William Thomas Calman